Jack Andrew King (born 20 August 1985) is a retired English professional footballer who played as a defender and midfielder.

After spells in the youth academies at Oxford United and Swansea City respectively, King played for local club Didcot Town in 2004. He subsequently joined Brackley Town in August 2004, before returning to Didcot a year later. He spent four years at Didcot before joining Farnborough, where he helped the club earn promotion to the Conference South. King then signed for Woking ahead of the 2011–12 season, with the club winning the Conference South title during his one season there.

A move into full-time professional football followed when he joined League One club Preston North End in 2012. He spent three seasons at Preston, culminating in promotion to the Championship during the 2014–15 season. King then signed for Scunthorpe United in the summer of 2015. He joined League Two club Stevenage on loan in August 2016, with the deal being made permanent in January 2017. King was released by Stevenage in May 2018 and subsequently signed for Ebbsfleet United of the National League a month later. He spent two years at Stonebridge Road before retiring from professional football in May 2020.

Career

Early career
King began playing football at Oxford United's School of Excellence, where he remained until he was 13. He subsequently signed for Swansea City's academy and trained locally to where he lived due to not being able to travel to Swansea each day. He did this for two years before moving to Swansea on a permanent basis when he was offered an academy scholarship aged 15. He spent three years at Swansea, although was ultimately not offered a professional contract. On not being offered a deal, King stated "it was disappointing. I sort of knew in the end. I got a knee injury when I was 18 and going into my third year. So it was no real surprise. I felt I was good enough at the time and will still always think that".

After leaving Swansea in January 2004, King was scheduled to train with Bristol Rovers for the remainder of the 2003–04 season. However, after arriving in Bristol he was unable to get international clearance to play from the Football Association of Wales, which meant he was unable to play professional football until the end of the season.

Non-League
Due to being unable to play professionally, King began working as a groundworker for his father's building company alongside playing semi-professional football for local club Didcot Town of the Hellenic Premier Division. After spending the remainder of the 2003–04 season at Didcot, King joined Brackley Town in August 2004. He rejoined Didcot three months into the following season in November 2005 and helped the club win the Hellenic Premier Division to earn promotion into the Southern Football League. He continued to play regularly for Didcot for several seasons whilst still working at his father's business, stating he received several offers to play in the Football League, although these offers did not appeal to him as he was progressing well in non-League. He scored 39 goals in over 150 appearances across his two spells at Didcot.

King left Didcot and joined Southern Premier Division club Farnborough on a two-year part-time contract before the start of the 2009–10 season. King played regularly in the first team during his two seasons at Farnborough; the first saw the club secure the Southern Premier Division title, and his second season resulted in a second-placed finish in the Conference South. He scored 21 goals in 106 appearances in all competitions over the two seasons. He opted to leave Farnborough ahead of the 2011–12 season as a result of the club deciding to go full-time. King stated playing full-time football did not appeal to him, despite "more and more interest coming in for him", due to still working for his family's business, meaning going full-time "wasn't an option". He subsequently signed to play part-time for fellow Conference South club Woking on a one-year contract in June 2011. King spent one season at Woking, scoring 12 times in 44 appearances as Woking won promotion back to the Conference National after finishing the season as champions.

Preston North End

King experienced full-time professional football for the first time when he signed for League One club Preston North End on a one-year contract in July 2012. Preston manager Graham Westley had previously scouted King several times whilst he managed Stevenage, but felt he was too similar a player to Michael Bostwick, and therefore no move materialised at the time. King made his debut for Preston in a 2–0 victory against Huddersfield Town in the League Cup on 13 August 2012, a game in which he scored the opening goal of the match courtesy of a header. King scored three times in four games in the opening months of the season; two coming in league victories against Hartlepool United and Doncaster Rovers respectively, and the other in a 3–1 League Cup defeat to Middlesbrough at Deepdale. King played regularly under new manager Simon Grayson, and scored his first goal under Grayson's management in Preston's 3–0 victory against Scunthorpe United on 6 April 2013, a headed goal from Jeffrey Monakana's cross to complete the win. He played 47 times during the 2012–13 season, scoring seven times, as Preston finished the season in 14th place in League One.

Ahead of the 2013–14 season, King was deployed at right-back, in central midfield and as a striker in the club's pre-season friendlies with Grayson planning on using his versatility throughout the season. He played in the club's first match of the new season, a 1–0 victory against rivals Blackpool in the League Cup on 5 August 2013. After the match, it was revealed that King had suffered a stress fracture in his foot and would not be available for selection for two months. He returned to the first team in November 2013, and scored his first goal of the season with a header to give Preston their first home win in two months in a 1–0 victory against Bristol City on 30 November 2013. In December 2013, King signed a contract extension to keep him at the club until the summer of 2015. He made 29 appearances during the season, most of which being deployed in the centre of defence, including two in the League One play-offs, as Preston were defeated 4–2 on aggregate by Rotherham United at the semi-final stage.

He remained at Preston for the 2014–15 season, making his first appearance of the season as a substitute in a 4–0 away victory against Scunthorpe United on 16 August 2014. He scored his first goal of the season a week later in Preston's 1–0 win over Oldham Athletic at Deepdale, scoring the only goal of the game from close range after Paul Gallagher's free-kick had not been cleared. King made 28 appearances in all competitions as Preston earned promotion to the Championship after winning the League One play-offs. King was released by Preston shortly after the end of the season. He made 102 appearances during his three years at Preston, scoring 10 goals.

Scunthorpe United
Following his departure from Preston, King signed for League One club Scunthorpe United on a free transfer, and on a two-year contract, on 26 May 2015. King was made vice-captain ahead of the start of the season behind club captain Stephen Dawson, although ultimately went on to captain the team for the majority of the first half of the season due to Dawson sustaining an injury. King debuted for Scunthorpe on the opening day of the 2015–16 season in a 2–1 defeat to newly promoted Burton Albion. He scored his first goal for the club in a 1–1 draw with Port Vale on 12 December 2015. He followed this up by scoring again three days later in Scunthorpe's 3–0 home win over Leyton Orient in an FA Cup Second Round replay, with the victory setting up an away tie with Premier League club Chelsea in January 2016, a match in which King also played in. Despite being a regular starter throughout the first half of the season, King started to play more often from the substitute's bench during the second half of the season. He made 42 appearances in all competitions during the season, with all 12 of his substitute appearances coming in the final months of the season, scoring two goals.

Stevenage
Having made no appearances for Scunthorpe in the opening weeks of the 2016–17 season, King joined League Two club Stevenage on 30 August 2016, on a loan agreement until January 2017. He made his debut for Stevenage the same day his signing was announced, playing the whole match in a 3–1 away defeat to Leyton Orient in the EFL Trophy. This was followed by his first league start for the club three days later, on 3 September 2016, in Stevenage's 6–1 victory against Hartlepool United at Broadhall Way. He scored his first goal for the Hertfordshire team a week later, doubling Stevenage's lead from close range from a Matt Godden cross in an eventual 2–1 win against Crawley Town. King made 23 appearances in all competitions during the loan spell, returning to his parent club upon the expiry of the loan agreement on 9 January 2017.

Three weeks later, on 31 January 2017, King signed for Stevenage on an 18-month permanent deal, joining on a free transfer. King remained a regular starter in the team for the remainder of the season, scoring two further goals during the season; in consecutive 3–0 home victories over Notts County and Portsmouth respectively in March 2017. King made 39 appearances for the club in all competitions in his first season for the club as Stevenage missed out on a play-off place following a tenth-place finish. The 2017–18 season saw King make 37 appearances in all competitions as Stevenage finished the League Two season in 16th position. King was released upon the expiry of his contract in May 2018.

Ebbsfleet United
Following his departure from Stevenage, King signed for National League club Ebbsfleet United on a free transfer on 27 June 2018. He made his Ebbsfleet debut in the club's first game of the 2018–19 season, playing the whole match in a 1–0 defeat to Chesterfield at Stonebridge Road on 4 August 2018. King started in the club's first eleven games of the season, before being left out of the team by manager Daryl McMahon following a 4–1 away defeat to Wrexham on 15 September 2018. He did not play again under McMahon, with King stating that he felt that the manager had "left him out in the cold" without communicating the reason behind him being left out of the first-team squad. McMahon was replaced by Garry Hill in November 2018, and King returned to the team, playing in a 0–0 FA Cup draw with League Two club Cheltenham Town on 10 November 2018. He scored his first goal for Ebbsfleet in a 2–0 home victory against Leyton Orient on 19 January 2019. He played regularly in defence for the remainder of the season, making 36 appearances during the season and scoring two goals.

King captained the team during the 2019–20 season, where he scored once in 39 appearances in a season that was curtailed by the COVID-19 pandemic in March 2020. He announced his retirement from playing in May 2020, returning to work full-time as a builder at his father's construction business.

Style of play
Described as a "versatile" player due to being deployed in several positions over the course of his career, King started out playing in central midfield and stated this was his natural position when progressing through the youth ranks and into semi-professional football. King also said that central midfield was where he prefers playing and where he has most experience.

During his time at Preston North End, King developed the versatile reputation due to playing in five different positions within the space of two months of arriving at the club. This included playing central defence, right-back, right-midfield, central midfield and as a striker. On this, King said "Playing in different positions is something I see as adding another string to my bow, it can help develop my game". In 2012, he also revealed that his manager at Preston, Graham Westley, believed that King should be looking at playing in central defence in the long-term. This proved to be the case as, from 2014 onward, this was where King was predominantly deployed.

Career statistics

Honours
Didcot Town
Hellenic Football League Premier Division: 2005–06

Farnborough
Southern Football League Premier Division: 2009–10

Woking
Conference South: 2011–12

Preston
Football League One play-offs: 2014–15

Individual
Conference South Team of the Year: 2011–12

References

External links

1985 births
Living people
Footballers from Oxford
English footballers
Association football defenders
Association football midfielders
Association football utility players
Swansea City A.F.C. players
Brackley Town F.C. players
Didcot Town F.C. players
Farnborough F.C. players
Woking F.C. players
Preston North End F.C. players
Scunthorpe United F.C. players
Stevenage F.C. players
Ebbsfleet United F.C. players
National League (English football) players
English Football League players